The 2013 season was Kelantan's 5th season in the Malaysia Super League. They were defending Malaysia Super League champions and aimed for 3rd league title this season. Furthermore, they were competing in the AFC Cup for the second consecutive seasons. In addition, they were competing in the domestic tournaments, the FA Cup and the Malaysia Cup as the last season's runners-up and defending champion respectively.

After a very successful 2012 season, winning a treble for the first time in their history, Kelantan started the season with busy pre-season player transfer activities. They already announce their sponsors for the 2013 season as well as presenting the new kits on 3 January 2013.

Pre-season and friendlies

Community Shield

The Sultan Haji Ahmad Shah Cup, more popularly known as Piala Sumbangsih (Charity Shield), is an annual soccer match currently contested by the current Malaysia Cup winner and the current Super League Malaysia winner. Since both trophies were won by Kelantan, FAM has decided that ATM as last season's Malaysia Cup runner-up to face Kelantan.

The match was played at Shah Alam Stadium on 5 January 2013, with kick-off at 8.45pm.

A deflected shot from Indra Putra gave Kelantan the lead in the 58th minute while a curled free kick taken by Irwan Fadzli Idrus five minutes from time cancelled the advantage. The match went straight to the penalty shoot-out and Kelantan failed by 2 shots; one from Rizal Fahmi which was saved by ATM keeper Farizal Harun and shot from Daudsu Jamaluddin hit the bar.

Super League

The fixtures for the 2012–13 season were announced on 10 December 2012. The league is set to start on 8 January 2013.

Kelantan started a bit nervy when the out-muscled PKNS in the very last minute on their first league match. Kelantan win 2–1 from goals from captain Badhri Radzi in 18th minute and Zairul Fitri's injury time header.

League table

FA Cup

Having finished as the champion of the FA Cup last season, Kelantan will begin their FA Cup campaign in the second round, having given a bye in the first round. The draw for the FA Cup's first and subsequent rounds was held on 10 December 2012 at Grand BlueWave Hotel, Shah Alam, Selangor. Kelantan will play against the winner of the first round match between PKNS and Lions XI.

Kelantan won the two-legged semi-finals to advance into the third consecutive FA Cup finals after beating Terengganu 6–5 on aggregate. They beat Johor Darul Takzim 1–0 during final on 29 June 2013 at National Stadium, Bukit Jalil, Kuala Lumpur.

Malaysia Cup

Group stage

Knockout stage

Kelantan won 8–5 on aggregate.

Semi-finals

Kelantan won 4–3 on aggregate.

Final

AFC Cup

Group stage

Having finished in the top of Super League last season, Kelantan will begin their AFC Cup campaign in the group stage. The draw for the qualifying play-off was held on 6 December 2012 in Kuala Lumpur.

Knockout stage

Kelantan advanced to the round of 16 after leading group G with 13 points, 1 point ahead of SHB Đà Nẵng. The matches for the round of 16 are decided prior to the group stage, with the winners of one group, which host the match, playing the runners-up of another group in the same zone.

Squad statistics
Kelantan FA has announced 2013 AFC Cup squad on 15 December 2012.

(Compiled from match statistics in Stadium Astro website. MSL GW 1, MSL GW 2, MSL GW 3, MSL GW 4, MSL GW 5, MSL GW 6, MSL GW 7, MSL GW 8, MSL GW 9, AFC Cup MD 1, MSL GW 10, AFC Cup MD 2, MSL GW 11, AFC Cup MD 3, AFC Cup MD 4, MSL GW 12, MSL GW 13, AFC Cup MD 5, MSL GW 14, AFC Cup MD 6, MSL GW 15, MSL GW 16)

 1 Wears jersey no. 28 in 2013 AFC squad, while no. 3 in 2013 AFC squad is for Mohammad Abdul Aziz Ismail.
 2 Wears jersey no. 22 in 2013 AFC squad, while no. 9 in 2013 AFC squad is for Keita Mandjou.
 3 Wears jersey no. 3 in 2013 AFC squad, while no. 11 in 2013 AFC squad is for Dimitri Petratos.
 5 Wears jersey no. 25 in 2013 AFC squad, while no. 22 in 2013 AFC squad is for Mohd Haris Safwan Mohd Kamal.
 6 Wears jersey no. 20 in 2013 AFC squad, while no. 25 in 2013 AFC squad is for Tuan Muhamad Faim Tuan Zainal Abidin.
 7 Wears jersey no. 11 in 2013 AFC squad, while no. 26 in 2013 AFC squad is for K. Nanthakumar.

Top scorers

*Last updated 27 October 2013.

Transfers

All start dates are pending confirmation.

In

Out

Loans in

Loans out

Club officials

Backroom staff

Sponsorship

Shirt sponsor
 Hotlink

Material manufacturer
 Warriors

Official sponsors
 AzizanOsman.com
 Adabi
 Mamee
 Sinar Harian
 Syarikat Muda Osman
 Trésenergy.com
 Desa Murni Batik
 Pure're Spritz
 Keropok Sira Cap Nara Pasir Puteh
 Wan Huzairil
 Yusri Maju Sdn. Bhd.
 Secretleaf
 Red Bull

See also
 2013 Malaysia Super League season
 List of Kelantan FA seasons

Notes

References

Kelantan FA
2013
Kelantan